The Dato Menteri LRT station is a light rapid transit (LRT) station nestled in the state capital city of Shah Alam in Selangor, Malaysia. It serves as one of the stations on the Shah Alam Line. The station is located at Section 14 where most of the important commercial and government departments in the state of Selangor are located.

The station is marked as Station No. 12 along the RM9 billion line project with the line's maintenance depot located in Johan Setia, Klang. This LRT station is expected to be operational in February 2024 and will have facilities such as public parking, kiosks, restrooms, elevators, taxi stand and feeder bus among others.

Surrounding Areas
 Shah Alam Convention Center (SACC)
 SACC Mall
 Kompleks PKNS Shah Alam Mall
 AVISENA Hospital
 UTC Selangor (Anggerik Mall)
 Wisma MBSA (Shah Alam City Council)
 Plaza Alam Sentral Mall
 Dataran Shah Alam
 Vista Alam Apartment
 Shah Alam Lake Garden
 Mardiyyah Hotel
 Sultan Alam Shah Museum (State Museum)
 Sultan Salahuddin Abdul Aziz Mosque (State Mosque)

External links
 LRT3 Bandar Utama–Klang line

Rapid transit stations in Selangor
Shah Alam Line